Monte San Savino is a town and comune in the province of Arezzo, Tuscany (Italy). It is located on the Essa stream in the Valdichiana.

History
Monte San Savino was one of the first urban settlements in Tuscany, Italy. It originated around 1100, but a further century had to pass before Monte San Savino could be considered a centre of a certain social, political and cultural importance of Tuscany in those times. But it is no longer now.

Main sights
 Palazzo di Monte
 Logge dei Mercanti
 Palazzo Pretorio
 Cassero
 Church of Santi Tiburzio and Susanna (13th century), at Gargonza, housing Tuscan Renaissance paintings.
 Church of the misericordia (1175, rebuilt in 1749). Its organ is one of the most ancient in Italy.
 Convent of Sant'Agostino (early 14th century, enlarged in the 16th century). It has a cloister from 1532. Both the church and the cloister were renovated by Andrea Sansovino (who was born here) in the early 16th century. The interior houses paintings by Spinello Aretino's school, by Paolo Schiavo and one Assumption by Giorgio Vasari.
 Sanctuary of Santa Maria delle Vertighe, rebuilt in the 16th century. It houses a fresco of the Virgin Enthroned with Child by Margaritone d'Arezzo.
 OPEM Chainsaws Inc.

Notable people
 Pope Julius III
 Angelo Fantoni, Catholic priest and exorcist
 Giulio Salvadori, poet and educator

References